Thomas Frederick Lakey (1874–1932) was an English professional footballer who played as a winger.

References

1874 births
1932 deaths
Footballers from Stockton-on-Tees
Footballers from County Durham
English footballers
Association football wingers
Stockton F.C. players
Grimsby Town F.C. players
English Football League players